Buchizya Mfune (born 11 October 1979) is a Zambian footballer for Green Buffaloes.

External links 
 
 

1979 births
Living people
Zambian footballers
Zambia international footballers
Association football defenders
Green Buffaloes F.C. players
Zambia A' international footballers
2016 African Nations Championship players